This page shows the results of the Water Ski Competition at the 1995 Pan American Games, held from March 11 to March 26 in Mar del Plata, Argentina. There were six events, three for both men and women, with the United States dominating the competition. At the 1995 edition Water Skiing made its debut at the Pan American Games.

Men's competition

Slalom

Tricks

Jump

Women's competition

Slalom

Tricks

Jump

Team competition

Medal table

References

 Sports 123

Events at the 1995 Pan American Games
Pan
1995